Leoš Janáček wrote two string quartets.  String Quartet No. 2, "Intimate Letters", was written in 1928. It has been referred to as Janáček's "manifesto on love".

Background 
The "Intimate Letters" quartet was the second to be composed after a request from the Bohemian Quartet who, in 1923, requested Janáček to compose two string quartets for them. The first was the "Kreutzer Sonata" quartet.

Unusually for a classical work, the nickname "Intimate Letters" ("Listy důvěrné" in Czech) was given by the composer, as it was inspired by his long and spiritual friendship with Kamila Stösslová, a married woman 38 years his junior. The composition was intended to reflect the character of their relationship as revealed in more than 700 letters they exchanged with each other:

"You stand behind every note, you, living, forceful, loving. The fragrance of your body, the glow of your kisses – no, really of mine. Those notes of mine kiss all of you. They call for you passionately..."

The première of the work took place on 11 September 1928, a month after Janáček died. The composition was performed by the Moravian Quartet.

Structure 
It consists of four movements:
 Andante - Con moto - Allegro
 Adagio - Vivace
 Moderato - Andante - Adagio
 Allegro - Andante - Adagio

The viola assumes a prominent role throughout the composition, as this instrument is intended to personify Kamila. The viola part was originally written for a viola d'amore, however the conventional viola was substituted when Janáček found the viola d'amore did not match the texture. Milan Škampa of the Smetana Quartet has interpreted the third "letter", or movement, as a lullaby for the son that Janáček and Kamila Stösslová never had together.

The work is essentially tonal albeit not in the traditional sense. For example, the work closes with six D-flat major chords (Janáček's favourite chord), but with the added dissonance of an E-flat.

References

External links 

Chamber music by Leoš Janáček
Janacek 2
1928 compositions